Astrophanes is a genus of bee flies (insects in the family Bombyliidae).

Species
Astrophanes adonis Osten Sacken, 1886
Astrophanes andinus Brèthes, 1909

References

Bombyliidae
Bombyliidae genera
Taxa named by Carl Robert Osten-Sacken
Diptera of South America
Diptera of North America